Aiara in Basque or Ayala in Spanish is a municipality located in the province of Álava, in the Basque Country, northern Spain.

Localities

Notes

References

External links
 AYALA in the Bernardo Estornés Lasa - Auñamendi Encyclopedia 

Municipalities in Álava